Tony Campbell may refer to:

 Tony Campbell (born 1962), a retired American professional basketball player.
 Tony Campbell (biblical scholar) (1934–2020), New Zealand biblical scholar
 Tony Campbell (footballer) (born 1967), a retired Australian professional Australian rules football player
 Tony Campbell (politician) (born 1965), an American politician from Maryland and US Senate candidate (2018)

See also 
 Tonie Campbell (born 1960), a retired American Olympic hurdler
 Anthony Campbell (disambiguation)